Elena Barbara Giuranna (18 November 1899 – 30 July 1998) was an Italian pianist and composer.

Life
Barbara Giuranna was born in Palermo, Italy and studied piano at the Palermo Conservatory with Guido Alberto Fano. She also studied composition at the Naples Conservatory with Camillo De Nardis and Antonio Savasta. She continued her education in composition at the Milan Conservatory with Giorgio Federico Ghedini.

After completing her studies, Giuranna taught at the Rome Conservatory from 1937 to 1970 and worked as an editor of 18th-century music. She was a music consultant to RAI in Rome from 1948 to 1956, and she was elected a member of the Accademia Nazionale di Santa Cecilia in 1982. She died in Rome.

Works
Giuranna composed works for stage, orchestra, chamber ensemble, chorus, violin, and piano. Giuranna also published arrangements of 18th-century music including Paisiello, Vivaldi, and Cimarosa. Selected works include:

La trappola d’oro (ballet), 1929
Jamanto (op, 3, Giuranna), opera 1941
Mayerling (op, 3, V. Viviani), Naples, S Carlo, 1960
Hosanna (op, 1, C. Pinelli), Palermo, Massimo, 1978 Choral: 3 cori, male chorus, 1940
3 canti alla Vergine, Soprano voice, female chorus, small orchestra, 1949
Missa sinite parvulos, children's chorus, harp, organ, 1992
Notturno, 1923
Apina rapita dai nani della montagna, suite after A. France, small orchestra, 1924
Marionette, 1927
X legio (Tenth Legion), Poema eroico per grande orchestra/Heroic Poem for Large orchestra, 1936
Toccata for orchestra, 1937
Patria 1938
Concerto for orchestra no.1, 1942
Episodi, wind, brass, timpani, piano, 1942
Concerto for orchestra no.2, 1965
Musica per Olivia, for small orchestra, 1970
Adagio e Allegro da concerto, 9 instruments, 1935
Sonatina, piano, 1935
Toccata, piano, 1937
Sonatina, harp, 1941
''Solo per viola', 1982

References

1899 births
1998 deaths
20th-century classical composers
Italian music educators
Women classical composers
Italian classical composers
Musicians from Palermo
20th-century Italian composers
Women music educators
20th-century women composers